Crenigomphus abyssinicus is a species of dragonfly in the family Gomphidae. It is endemic to Ethiopia.  Its natural habitat is rivers. It is threatened by habitat loss.

References

Endemic fauna of Ethiopia
Gomphidae
Insects of Ethiopia
Insects described in 1878
Taxonomy articles created by Polbot